Mariana Victoria may refer to:
 Mariana Victoria of Spain (1718-1781)
 Mariana Victoria of Portugal (1768-1788)